Ayten Amer (born Samar Ahmed Abd El Ghaffar Amer, 22 November 1986, Alexandria, Egypt) is an Egyptian actress.

Career
Amer moved to Cairo when she was four. She later studied acting and directing and worked as a model, which helped her overcome her fear of the camera. Her first major role was in Hadret El Motaham Aby (Mr. Guilty is My Father), with Nour El Sherif.

Personal life
Amer is the sister of actress Wafaa Amer, and has one daughter, Ayten Ezzelarab.

Filmography 
 Sukkar Mor
 Elleila Elkebira
 Zana'et Settat
 Salem Abu Okhto
 Betawqit Elqahera
 Cart Memory
 Ala Gothety
 Harag we Marag 
 Hasal Kh'eer
 Sa3a we Nos
 Banat ElA'm
 Ya t'addi, Ya T-haddi

Series 
 Shaqet Faisal
 Bein AL Sarayat
 Al Ahd (El Kalam El Mobah)
 El Boyoot Asrar
 Kika Alal Ali
 Elsabaa Wasaya
 Al Walida Basha
 El Zowga El Tanya
 Al Zoga Al Raba'a
 Keed El-Nesa
 Afrah
 Ayoub ramadan 2018 
 3anbar 6
 7adret el motaham 2aby

References

External links 
 
 

Egyptian film actresses
1986 births
Living people
Egyptian television actresses
Egyptian stage actresses
People from Alexandria